Robert Stephen Briffault  (1874 – 11 December 1948) was a French surgeon who found fame as a social anthropologist and later in life as a novelist.

Biography 
Briffault was born in either France or London, likely in 1874, the son of a French diplomat, and the Scottish Margaret Mann (née Stewart). He later cited his year of birth as 1876, likely to be young enough to enter the army in the First World War.

He spent time in France and elsewhere in Europe following his father. After the death of his father in 1887, Briffault and his mother  moved to New Zealand. Briffault received his MB and ChB from the University of Otago in New Zealand and commenced medical practice. After service on the Western Front during the war, (where he was twice awarded the Military Cross)), he settled in England where he turned to the study of sociology and anthropology. He also lived for some time in the USA, and later Paris.

Briffault debated the institution of marriage with Bronisław Malinowski in the 1930s and corresponded with Bertrand Russell.

He died in Hastings, Sussex, England on 11 December 1948.

Asked how to pronounce his name, Briffault told The Literary Digest: "Should be pronounced bree'-foh, without attempting to give it a French pronunciation."
 
His first wife (m. 1896) was Anna Clarke, with whom he had three children. After her death in 1919, he married Herma Hoyt (1898–1981), an American writer and translator.

Briffault's law 

Briffault is known for what is called Briffault's law:

The female, not the male, determines all the conditions of the animal family. Where the female can derive no benefit from association with the male, no such association takes place. — Robert Briffault, The Mothers. Vol. I, p. 191

Commentary on works 
In 1930, H. L. Mencken wrote the following in his Treatise on the Gods:

Primitive society, like many savage societies of our own time, was probably strictly matriarchal. The mother was the head of the family. ...What masculine authority there was resided in the mother's brother. He was the man of the family, and to him the children yielded respect and obedience. Their father, at best, was simply a pleasant friend who fed them and played with them; at worst, he was an indecent loafer who sponged on the mother. They belonged, not to his family, but to their mother's. As they grew up they joined their uncle's group of hunters, not their father's. This matriarchal organisation of the primitive tribe, though it finds obvious evidential support in the habits of higher animals, has been questioned by many anthropologists, but of late one of them, Briffault, demonstrated its high probability in three immense volumes [The Mothers: A Study of the Origins of Sentiments and Institutions]. It is hard to escape the cogency of his arguments, for they are based upon an almost overwhelming accumulation of facts. They not only show that, in what we may plausibly assume about the institutions of early man and in what we know positively about the institutions of savages today, the concepts inseparable from a matriarchate colour every custom and every idea: they show also that those primeval concepts still condition our own ways of thinking and doing things, so that "the societal characters of the human mind" all seem to go back "to the functions of the female and not to those of the male." Thus it appears that man, in his remote infancy, was by no means the lord of creation that he has since become."

Works

Non-fiction
The Making of Humanity (1919)
Psyche's Lamp: A Re-evaluation of Psychological Principles as a Foundation of All Thought (1921)
The Mothers: A Study of the Origins of Sentiments and Institutions, Vol. II, Vol. III, (1927)
 "Group-Marriage and Sex Communism." In V. F. Calverton, ed., The Making of Man, The Modern Library, 1931.
 "The Origin of Love." In V. F. Calverton, ed., The Making of Man, The Modern Library, 1931.
Rational Evolution (1930)
Sin and Sex (1931)
Breakdown: The Collapse of Traditional Civilization (1932)
Reasons for Anger: Selected Essays (1937)
The Decline and Fall of the British Empire (1938)
Marriage Past and Present (1956) edited radio debate between Briffault and Bronislaw Malinowski, originally published as a series in The Listener
Les Troubadours et le Sentiment Romanesque (1945)
The Troubadours (1965)

Fiction
Europa: A Novel of the Days of Ignorance (1935) 
 "Europa." In Modern Women in Love: Sixty Twentieth-century Masterpieces of Fiction, The Dryden Press, 1945.
Europa in Limbo (1937)
The Ambassadress (1939)
Fandango (1940)
New Life of Mr. Martin (1947)

Articles
 "The Downfall of Old Europe," Part II, The English Review, February/March 1920.
 "Nemesis," The English Review, October 1920.
 "We," The English Review, November 1920.
 “Aristocracy,” The English Review, December 1920.
 "Inpersonality," The English Review, May 1921.
 "The Wail of Grub Street," The English Review, July 1921.
 "Will Monogamy Die Out?" In Ernest R. Groves and Lee M. Brooks, ed., Readings in the Family, J. B. Lippincott Company, 1934.

Other
 "Birth Customs." In Edwin R. A. Seligman, ed.,  Encyclopedia of the Social Sciences, Vol. II, The Macmillan Company, 1930.

References

Further reading
 Katz, Edward A. (1976). The Social Philosophy of Robert Briffault: An Appraisal of His Writings, New York University, Graduate School, 1976.
 Sloan, Pat (1962). "An 'Unknown Soldier' in the Battle of Ideas," Marxism Today, Vol. VI, No. 5.

External links

 Letters of Robert Briffault

1874 births
1948 deaths
Recipients of the Military Cross
20th-century British medical doctors
British people of French descent